August Koern (27 April 1900 in Uue-Võidu, Viljandi County – 11 January 1989 in Copenhagen) was an Estonian statesman and diplomat. He was Estonian foreign minister in exile from 1 March 1964 to 3 June 1982.

References

1900 births
1989 deaths
People from Viljandi Parish
People from the Governorate of Livonia
Government ministers of Estonia
Estonian diplomats
Danish people of Estonian descent
Estonian World War II refugees